Przemysław Krajewski (born 20 January 1987) is a Polish handball player for Wisła Płock  and the Polish national team.

He was a bronze medalist of the 2015 World Championship.

Career

National team
On 1 February 2015, Poland, including Krajewski, won the bronze medal of the 2015 World Championship. In the winning bronze medal match (29:28) Poland beat Spain in extra time. He also participated at the 2016 Summer Olympics in Rio de Janeiro, in the men's handball tournament.

Sporting achievements

State awards
2015  Silver Cross of Merit

References

External links

1987 births
Living people
People from Ciechanów
Sportspeople from Masovian Voivodeship
Wisła Płock (handball) players
Polish male handball players
Handball players at the 2016 Summer Olympics
Olympic handball players of Poland